The 2020 Washington Democratic presidential primary took place on March 10, 2020, as one of several states voting the week after Super Tuesday in the Democratic Party primaries for the 2020 presidential election. The state-run semi-open primary, which was used instead of party-run caucuses for the very first time by Washington's Democrats, awarded 109 delegates to the 2020 Democratic National Convention, of which 89 were pledged delegates allocated according to the results of the primary.

On March 16, 2020, almost a week after the primary, major news outlets including CNN, NBC, The New York Times, and the Associated Press called the narrow race for former vice president Joe Biden, who won 37.9% of the vote and 46 delegates, around 20,000 votes ahead of senator Bernie Sanders. Sanders reached 36.6% of the vote and received 43 delegates, adding another crucial loss to his campaign, while a win, widely expected in polls, had been seen as vital for him to remain a realistic contender for the presidential nomination. Senator Elizabeth Warren and former mayor Michael Bloomberg, who had already withdrawn from the race, came close to 10% of the vote due to early votes, winning no delegates.

Procedure
Washington was one of six states (along with Democrats Abroad) which held primaries on March 10, 2020, one week after Super Tuesday. As a primary totally done by mail-in voting, it took place from February 21 to March 10, 2020. On March 14, 2019, Governor Jay Inslee had signed a bill moving the state's previously non-binding presidential primary up from May to the second Tuesday in March, roughly the typical time frame Democrats had already been using for their caucuses in the past. A month later, on April 7, 2019, the Washington Democratic Party's central committee historically approved the usage of the hybrid vote-by-mail presidential primary in a 121–40 vote, marking the first time in the state's history that Democrats used a primary.

In Washington, a vote-by-mail state, there was an 18-day voting period and all ballots had to be either dropped off by 8:00 p.m. at a designated ballot box or postmarked by the date of the primary. For people's votes to be counted, they had to select either a Democratic or Republican ballot. Both ballots were distributed to every registered voter, as Washington State did not track party registration; no independent ballots existed. In the primary, candidates had to meet a threshold of 15 percent at the congressional district or statewide level to be considered viable. The 89 pledged delegates to the 2020 Democratic National Convention were allocated proportionally on the basis of the results of the primary. Of these, between 3 and 11 were allocated to each of the state's 10 congressional districts and another 12 were allocated to party leaders and elected officials (PLEO delegates), in addition to 19 at-large delegates. The March primary as part of Stage I on the primary timetable received no bonus delegates, in order to disperse the primaries between more different date clusters and keep too many states from hoarding on a March date.

Following legislative district caucuses on April 26, 2020, to choose delegates to congressional district caucuses and the state convention, or county conventions on May 3, 2020, also to choose delegates to congressional district caucuses and the state convention, the congressional district caucuses met on May 30, 2020 to select national convention district delegates. The state party committee subsequently met at the state convention between June 13 and June 14, 2020, to vote on the 19 at-large and 12 pledged PLEO delegates for the Democratic National Convention. The delegation also included 20 unpledged PLEO delegates: 10 members of the Democratic National Committee, 9 members of Congress (both Senators and 7 representatives), and the governor Jay Inslee.

Candidates 
The following individuals qualified for the ballot in Washington:

Running

Joe Biden
Tulsi Gabbard
Bernie Sanders

Withdrawn

Michael Bennet
Michael Bloomberg
Cory Booker
Pete Buttigieg
John Delaney
Amy Klobuchar
Deval Patrick
Tom Steyer
Elizabeth Warren
Andrew Yang

There was also an uncommitted option on the ballot.

Polling

Results

Results by county

Analysis
Joe Biden won the Washington primary by a narrow 1.4 point margin, a regression for Bernie Sanders who in 2016 had beat Hillary Clinton in the state by a large 45 point margin in a caucus. Men made up 42% of the electorate, and Sanders won this group 41–28, while among women, who made up 58% of the electorate, Biden won 36–27. Sanders ran most strongly among voters ages 18–44, as he won this group 59–16. In contrast, Biden won among voters over the age of 45, 39–23.

See also
 2020 Washington Republican presidential primary

Notes

References

External links
Washington Democratic Party draft delegate selection plan

Washington Democratic
Democratic primary
2020